Screw piles, sometimes referred to as screw-piles, screw piers, screw anchors, screw foundations, ground screws, helical piles,  helical piers, or helical anchors are a steel screw-in piling and ground anchoring system used for building deep foundations.  Screw piles are typically manufactured from high-strength steel using varying sizes of tubular hollow sections for the pile or anchors shaft.

The pile shaft transfers a structure's load into the pile.  Helical steel plates are welded to the pile shaft in accordance with the intended ground conditions.  Helices can be press-formed to a specified pitch or simply consist of flat plates welded at a specified pitch to the pile's shaft. The number of helices, their diameters and position on the pile shaft as well as steel plate thickness are all determined by a combination of:

 The combined structure design load requirement
 The geotechnical parameters
 Environmental corrosion parameters
 The minimum design life of the structure being supported or restrained.

Screw pile steel shaft sections are subjected to design parameters and building codes standards for the region of manufacture.

The helices that are welded over the steel shaft are also called "helical flights" or just "flights", and can vary in size depending on surface conditions.

There are a few differences between helical anchors, helical piles and helical piers, although the terms are often used interchangeably. Helical anchors consist of an extendable steel shaft with helical bearing plates. Piles or piers refer to strong base elements that withstand or transfer vertical/horizontal loads. Anchors are piles utilized only in tension applications like restraining wall tiebacks or vertical ground anchors made to resist overturning forces.

Installation
Screw piles are wound into the ground much like a screw into wood.  Screw piles are installed using various earthmoving equipment fitted with rotary hydraulic attachments.  Machinery varies from skid-steer loaders to 5 tonne through 80 tonne excavators.  Rotary hydraulic powerheads with torque capacities ranging from 5,000 Nm to 500,000 Nm are custom fitted using various boom configurations.  Special drive attachments connect the screw pile to the machine.  Correct installation techniques are paramount to meet engineered design load and settlement outcomes.  Incorrect techniques are likely to result in poor overall pile performance.

Development

Screw piles were first described by the Irish civil engineer Alexander Mitchell in a paper in Civil Engineer and Architect's Journal in 1848; however, helical piles had been used for almost a decade by this point. Screw foundations first appeared in the 1800s  as pile foundations for lighthouses, and were extensively used for piers in harbours. Between the 1850s through 1890s, more than 100 screw-pile lighthouses were erected on the east coast of the United States using screw piles. Made originally from cast or wrought iron, they had limited bearing and tension capacities.

More recently, composite technology has been developed and patented for use in small screw piles.  Composites offer significant advantages over steel in small screw pile manufacture and installed performance.

Modern use and benefits
Screw pile are used extensively, and their usage has extended from lighthouses to rail, telecommunications, roads, and numerous other industries where fast installation is required, or building work takes place close to existing structures.

Screw pile installations have also extended to residential applications, with many homeowners choosing a screw pile over other options. Some common applications for helical pile foundations include residential decks, sheds, cement pads, preformed stairs and grade beams.

Modern screw pile design is based on standard structural and geotechnical principles. Screw pile designers typically use their own design software which has been developed through field testing of differing compression pile and tension anchor configurations in various soil profiles. Corrosion is addressed based on extended field trials, combined with worldwide databases on steel in ground corrosion. Large load capacity screw piles may have various components such as flat half helices, Bisalloy cutting tips and helices, cap plates or re-bar interfaces for connection to various concrete or steel structures.

Most industries use screw piling experts due to the cost efficiencies and, increasingly, the reduced environmental impact. "Screwing" the foundations into the ground means that there is less soil displacement so excess soil does not need to be transported from the site, saving on transportation costs and reducing the carbon footprint of the project.

The main benefits of screw pile include: shorter project times, ease of installation, ease of access, reduction of the carbon footprint, ease of removal when the foundations are no longer required, reduced risk to the workforce, and reduced costs.

They are also suitable for both tensile and compression loads, so they are also used for masts, signs, and retaining structures.

References 

Deep foundations